Patriarch Gavrilo may refer to.

Patriarch Gavrilo I, Serbian Patriarch (1648–1655)
Patriarch Gavrilo II, Serbian Patriarch (1752)
Patriarch Gavrilo III, Serbian Patriarch (1752–1755)
Patriarch Gavrilo IV, Serbian Patriarch (1758)
Patriarch Gavrilo V, Serbian Patriarch (1938–1950)

See also
Gavrilo
 Patriarch Arsenije (disambiguation)